The 1914 Nevada gubernatorial election was held on November 3, 1914. Democratic nominee Emmet D. Boyle defeated incumbent Republican Tasker Oddie with 44.65% of the vote.

Primary elections
Primary elections were held on September 1, 1914.

Democratic primary

Candidates
Emmet D. Boyle, member of the Nevada State Tax Commission
Lemuel Allen, former Lieutenant Governor

Results

General election

Candidates
Major party candidates
Emmet D. Boyle, Democratic
Tasker Oddie, Republican

Other candidates
W. A. Morgan, Socialist

Results

References

1914
Nevada
Gubernatorial